The Benton Community School District, or Benton Community, is a rural public school district headquartered in Van Horne, Iowa.

The district is mostly in Benton County with portions in Iowa and Tama counties. It comprises seven rural municipalities: Van Horne, Atkins, Blairstown, Elberon,  Keystone,  Newhall, and Norway. It also serves Watkins; additional students come from Marengo, and Garrison.

Dr. Pamela Ewell was hired as superintendent in 2019, after previous positions as superintendent at Mount Vernon  and Van Buren County Schools.

History
A consolidated school board from Keystone, Van Horne, Newhall and Blairstown met from 1962 to 1964 for the planning of the consolidated BCSD, which was officially formed in July 1964.

The Norway school district merged into the Benton district on July 1, 1995. The schools themselves consolidated earlier in a grade-sharing arrangement in the fall of 1991. From this consolidation, the movie The Final Season portrayed the final state title of the Norway High School baseball team.

Schools
 Benton Community Elementary Schools: (Preschool through sixth grades):  
 Atkins Elementary School
 Keystone Elementary School
 Norway Elementary School  
 The Middle School and High School (Seventh and Eighth grades) and (Ninth through Twelfth grades), respectively, are in a single facility in Van Horne.

References

External links
 District website

See also
List of school districts in Iowa
List of high schools in Iowa

School districts in Iowa
Education in Benton County, Iowa
Education in Iowa County, Iowa
Education in Tama County, Iowa
School districts established  in 1964
1964 establishments in Iowa